Adagilton dos Santos (born 17 July 1979 in Nossa Senhora das Dores, Sergipe), known as Dagil, is a Brazilian footballer who plays for  in the Campeonato Sergipano as a striker.

References

External links

1979 births
Living people
Sportspeople from Sergipe
Brazilian footballers
Association football forwards
Associação Desportiva Confiança players
Primeira Liga players
Liga Portugal 2 players
Segunda Divisão players
G.D. Ribeirão players
G.D. Estoril Praia players
C.D. Trofense players
S.C. Covilhã players
Gil Vicente F.C. players
Gondomar S.C. players
Brazilian expatriate footballers
Expatriate footballers in Portugal
Brazilian expatriate sportspeople in Portugal